Biltmore Hospital, also known as the Biltmore Hospital Extension and Memorial Mission Hospital, is a historic hospital building located at Biltmore Village, Asheville, Buncombe County, North Carolina. It was built in 1929–1930, and originally known as the Battle Wing to the Clarence Barker Memorial Hospital.  It is a four-story, 13 bay by 3 bay, brick and stone building with a flat roof and Tudor Revival style design elements.  A two-story wing was completed in 1953 for the Imperial Life Insurance Company.  Also on the property are contributing culverts and a sign.

It was listed on the National Register of Historic Places in 2005.

References

External links

Hospital buildings on the National Register of Historic Places in North Carolina
Tudor Revival architecture in North Carolina
Hospital buildings completed in 1930
Buildings and structures in Asheville, North Carolina
National Register of Historic Places in Buncombe County, North Carolina